Jack Edwards (born 1957) is an American sports commentator. Since 2005, he has provided play-by-play commentary for Boston Bruins games on NESN television. From 1991 to 2003, he worked for ESPN as an anchor for their sports news program SportsCenter, as well as a play-by-play commentator for their NHL, MLS, Little League Baseball, and 2002 FIFA World Cup broadcasts. Edwards provided commentary for the Konami game MLS Extra Time 2002.

Broadcasting career

Early career 
Edwards started as a play-by-play announcer for the University of New Hampshire hockey team. He then moved on to play-by-play and sports anchor positions at WGIR radio and WMUR-TV in Manchester, New Hampshire. During the early 1980s, he worked as a talk radio host for WRKO in Boston and as a weekend anchor at WJAR-TV in Providence. He then moved to a sports reporter position at WCVB-TV in Boston. While at WCVB-TV, Edwards also served as a freelance play by play announcer for ESPN. Among the events he called were the Davis Cup finals and Frozen Four. He also served as a reporter for ABC's coverage of alpine skiing at the 1988 Winter Olympics.

In 1988, Edwards became the weekend sports anchor for Boston's WNEV-TV/WHDH-TV. While working for the then-CBS affiliate, Edwards also called some events for the network, including the US Open and the 1991 Olympic Winterfest.

ESPN 
In 1991, Edwards joined ESPN as a SportsCenter anchor and reporter. Edwards also did announcing for Little League baseball from 1995 to 2002, the X Games in 1996, ESPN National Hockey Night from 1999 to 2003, and soccer, including coverage of the 2002 FIFA World Cup.

Post-ESPN
In 2003, Edwards joined College Sports Television, a newly launched speciality cable sports channel. Edwards also became play-by-play announcer for Chicago Fire soccer broadcasts on Fox Sports Net Chicago.

Boston Bruins
Edwards began calling Boston Bruins games during the 2005–06 NHL season for NESN, handling the road games while Dale Arnold covered the home games. At the start of the 2007–08 NHL season, Edwards began calling all Bruins games and has been the team's local play-by-play commentator since then. He received a 2011 Stanley Cup Championship ring for his play-by-play work with the Bruins.

Personal life
Edwards is married to Lisa Kraus. They live in Simsbury, Connecticut.

References

External links
 

American television sports announcers
National Hockey League broadcasters
Living people
People from Durham, New Hampshire
Television anchors from Boston
Olympic Games broadcasters
American soccer commentators
Boston Bruins announcers
University of New Hampshire alumni
Baseball announcers
College hockey announcers in the United States
American male journalists
Major League Soccer broadcasters
People from Simsbury, Connecticut
1957 births